WMHT-FM (89.1 MHz) is a listener-supported, non-commercial radio station licensed to Schenectady, and serving the Capital District of New York.  It has a classical music radio format, with most programming originating in-house, but with some shows and news from National Public Radio, American Public Media and the Public Radio Exchange.   It is the sister station to WMHT Channel 17, the PBS member station for the Albany/Schenectady/Troy media market.

WMHT-FM has an effective radiated power (ERP) of 6,100 watts. The transmitter is located on the Helderberg Escarpment antenna farm on Pinnacle Road in New Salem, New York.  WMHT-FM broadcasts using HD Radio technology.

WMHT-FM programming is also heard on a part-time basis on FM 88.7 WRHV in Poughkeepsie, which is involved in one of the last radio timeshare arrangements in the United States alongside State University of New York at New Paltz-owned WFNP-FM. From October 2005 to March 2006, WMHT-FM programming was also heard on co-owned FM 97.7 WBKK in Amsterdam.  That station now airs an adult album alternative format, also heard on WMHT-FM's HD2 digital subchannel.

History
From its founding in 1972, WMHT-FM has been a classical music station. The plans for the format came into being in the wake of 92.3 WFLY leaving the classical format in 1969 and an ensuing protest from prominent members of the community.  Although a number of PBS stations were launching sister NPR news and information stations, the presence of NPR affiliate 90.3 WAMC in Albany kept WMHT from such an opportunity.

WMHT decided to go in a different direction by launching a classical station.  WMHT paid Siena College-owned WVCR-FM to vacate its 89.1 frequency, switching to 88.3 MHz.  On , WMHT-FM officially signed on the air.  Because the WMHT call sign, which stood for "Mohawk–Hudson Television", was already established for Channel 17, the FM station took the same call letters.  The Mohawk-Hudson Council on Educational Television was the original name of the organization that put Channel 17 on the air.

WMHT-FM's signature program is "Bach's Lunch," a program originally conceived by Pam Mittendorff and Chris Wienk of WSHU-FM in Fairfield, Connecticut.  Wienk brought the program to WMHT-FM after it stopped airing on WSHU-FM.

In July 2007, WMHT launched Amsterdam-licensed WEXT (97.7), branded as "Exit 97.7", after the purchase of the commercial license for WBKK, which removed the station's main competitor in the market. WEXT currently runs a non-commercial adult album alternative (AAA) format, along with a focus on local Capital Region artists.

Original programming
Bach's Lunch: A program of Baroque music  airing on weekdays at noon. The host is Chris Wienk.
WMHT Live: A full-length concert program featuring recordings of recent classical concerts in the Capital District.
No Ticket Required: A program of concert excerpts featuring recordings of recent classical concerts in the Capital District.
Serenade: A program of classical music featuring nocturnes, adagios and andantes produced by Wayne Henning.

RISE
WMHT also provides an information service for those who are blind and "print-disabled" known as RISE, which has been in operation since 1978. RISE programming is on the subcarriers of both WMHT-FM and WRHV-FM (even when WRHV-FM is not on the air).

See also
WMHT (TV)

References

External links
WMHT-FM's website

MHT-FM
NPR member stations
Classical music radio stations in the United States
Radio stations established in 1972